Sidera can be:

Sidera 
 Sidera, a genus of fungi
 Seleucia Sidera, ancient city in the northern part of Pisidia, Anatolia
 Cosmica Sidera, initial name for Galilean moons
 Sidera Lodoicea, name given by the astronomer Giovanni Domenico Cassini to the four moons of Saturn
 Quem terra, pontus, sidera, ancient hymn in honour of the Blessed Virgin
 Sidera, a neighbourhood in Chalandri
 Sidera Networks, U.S. telecom company

Sideras 
 Loukas Sideras, drummer of the Greek progressive rock band Aphrodite's Child
 Sideras, a village in Greece

See also
 Sidus (disambiguation); "sidus" is the singular for the Latin "sidera"